The term Money Honey could refer to the following:
 "Money Honey", the first electromechanical slot machine created in 1964, developed by Bally Technologies
 Money Honey, a nickname for Maria Bartiromo during her work with the CNBC finance news channel

Music
 "Money Honey" (Clyde McPhatter and The Drifters song), 1953
 "Money Honey (Bay City Rollers song)", 1976
 "Money, Honey", a 1979 song by Luv' from their LP Lots of Luv', 1979
 "Money Honey" (Alexia song), 2001
 "Money Honey" (State of Shock song), 2007
 "Money Honey", a song by Lady Gaga from her debut album, The Fame, 2008